Nicole is a feminine given name and a surname.

The given name Nicole is a French feminine derivative of the masculine given name Nicolas, which is of Greek origin and has been formed as a compound of the words for "victory" and "people" (hence it may be interpreted as "victory of the people"). There are many variants. The spelling "Nicole" was anciently used as a man's name, e.g., Nicole Oresme.

People with the given name or variants

Music

 Nicole (German singer) (born 1964), known for "Ein bißchen Frieden"
 Nicole (Chilean singer) (born 1977), pop and rock singer
 Nicole Cabell (born 1977), American classical and opera singer
 Nicole Dollanganger (born 1991), Canadian singer-songwriter
 Nicole Jung (born 1991), Korean American singer, member of the band Kara
 Nicole C. Mullen (born 1967), American singer, songwriter, actress, and choreographer
 Nicole Scherzinger (born 1978), American singer-songwriter, dancer, lead singer of The Pussycat Dolls
 Nicole Theriault (born 1972), Thai pop singer
 Nicole Wray (born 1979), American R&B singer
 Nicole Zefanya (born 1999), Indonesian singer-songwriter

Literature
 Nicole Brossard (born 1943), French-Canadian formalist poet and novelist
 Nicole Chung (born 1981), American writer
 Nicole Krauss (born 1974), American writer
 Nicole Markotic (born 1962), Canadian poet and novelist

 Nicole Gale Anderson (born 1990), American actress
 Nicole Blonsky (born 1988), American actress, singer, and dancer
 Nicole de Boer (born 1970), Canadian actress
 Nicole DeHuff (1975–2005), American actress
 Nicole Eggert (born 1972), American actress
 Nicole Holofcener (born 1960), American film and television director
 Nicole Kidman (born 1967), Australian-American actress, singer and film producer
 Nicole Maines (born 1997), American actress and transgender rights activist
 Nicole Oliver (born 1970), Canadian actress
 Nicole Paggi (born 1977), American actress
 Nicole Parker (born 1978), American actress and singer
 Nicole Ari Parker (born 1970), American actress and former model 
 Nicole Polizzi (born 1987), American reality television star, former occasional professional wrestler
 Nicole Houston Reed (born 1988), Best known as Nikki Reed American actress, screenwriter, singer-songwriter, and model
 Nicole Steinwedell (born 1981), American actress
 Nicole Sullivan (born 1970), American actress, comedian, and voice artist
 Nicole Tubiola (born 1979), American actress
 Nicol Williamson (1936–2011), British actor

Modelling
 Nicole Abe (安部ニコル) (born 1993), Japanese-Filipina gyaru fashion model
 Nicole Borromeo (born 2000), Filipino model and beauty pageant titleholder
 Nicole Cordoves (born 1992), Filipino model, host, and beauty pageant titleholder
 Nicole Dunsdon (born 1970), the last person to win the Miss Canada competition
 Nicole Faria (born 1990), Indian model
 Nicole Fox (born 1991), model, winner of America's Next Top Model, Cycle 13
 Nicole Linkletter (born 1986), American model, winner of America's Next Top Model, Cycle 5
 Nicole Narain (born 1974), American model
 Nicole Renee Taylor, also known as Niki Taylor (born 1975), American model
 Nicole Trunfio (born 1986), Australian model
 Nicole Whitehead (born 1980), American model

Sport
 Nicole Arendt (born 1969), American tennis player
 Nicole Bass (1964–2017), American bodybuilder, actress, retired professional wrestler
 Nicole Bates (born 1998), American softball player
 Nicole Bradtke (born 1969), Australian former tennis player
 Nicole Cooke (born 1983), British cyclist
 Nicole Davis (born 1982), American volleyball player
 Nicole den Dulk (born 1980), Dutch Paralympic equestrian
 Nicole Freedman (born 1972), American Olympic cyclist
 Nicole Gibbs (born 1993), American tennis player
 Nicole Haynes (born 1974), Canadian-American athlete
 Nicole Hetzer (born 1979), German swimmer
 Nicole Livingstone (born 1971), Australian swimmer
 Nicole Muns-Jagerman (born 1967), Dutch tennis player
 Nicole Nadel (born 2000), Israeli tennis player 
 Nicole Pircio (born 2002), Brazilian rhythmic gymnast
 Nicole Powell (born 1982), American basketball player
 Nicole Pratt (born 1973), Australian former tennis player
 Nicole Raczynski (born 1979), American professional wrestler and former TNA Knockout
 Nicole Ross (born 1989), American Olympic foil fencer
 Nicole Schnyder-Benoit (born 1973), Swiss beach volleyball player
 Nicole Toomey (born 2002), New Zealand international lawn bowler
 Nicole Tully (born 1986), American distance runner
 Nicole Uphoff (born 1967), German equestrian 
 Nicole Vaidišová (born 1989), Czech tennis player

Other notables
 Nicole, Countess of Penthièvre (c. 1424–1480)
 Nicole, Duchess of Lorraine (1608–1657)
 Nicole Abusharif (born 1980), American murderer convicted killing her lesbian partner Rebecca Klein
 Nicole Brown Simpson (1959–1994), O.J. Simpson's murdered ex-wife
 Nicole Camphaug, Canadian Inuk fashion designer
 Nicole Diar, American murderer convicted of the arson murder of her son, Jacob in 2003
 Nicole Dorsey, Canadian director and screenwriter
 Nicole R. Fleetwood, professor of American Studies and Art History at Rutgers University
 Nicole Fontaine (1942–2018), French politician and Member of the European Parliament
 Nicole de Hauteclocque (1913–1993), French resistance fighter and politician
 Nicole van den Hurk (1980–1995), Dutch homicide victim
 Nicole Juteau (born 1954), Canadian police officer
 Nicole-Reine Lepaute (1723–1788), French astronomer
 Nicole Miller (born 1952), American fashion designer
 Nicole Mones (born 1952), American novelist and food writer
 Nicole Richie (born 1981), American socialite, reality television star, fashion designer, and actress
 Nicole Stott (born 1962), American astronaut
 Nicole Tung (born 1986), Hong Kong-born photojournalist
 Nicole Wong, American vice president and deputy general counsel at Google

Surname

 Bruno Nicolè (1940–2019), Italian footballer
 Pierre Nicole (1625–1695), French philosopher
 Jayde Nicole (1986), Canadian model

Fictional characters
 Nico Collard, Broken Sword games
 Nicole (Dead or Alive character)
 Nicole, a Canadian student on Kelas Internasional
 Nicole, a doll featured in The Groovy Girls line by Manhattan Toys
 Nicole, played by Estelle Skornik, one half of advertising double act Papa & Nicole, who were the joint face of the Renault Clio in the 1990s
 The titular character (played by Joan Collins) in TV series Mission: Impossible'''s third-season episode Nicole NICOLE, sentient, hand-held computer and lynx in the Sonic the Hedgehog television series and comic books
 Nicole, a character in the animated sitcom Family Guy Nicole Bristow, a character in the Nickelodeon show Zoey 101 Nicole Chapman, a character from the television series Fame, played by Nia Peeples
 Nicole Diver, a leading character in F. Scott Fitzgerald's novel Tender Is the Night Nicole Ingalls from The Work and the Glory Nicole des Jardins Wakefield, in the sequels to Rendezvous with Rama Nicole Maris, a character in the teen comedy film Drive Me Crazy (1999)
 Nicole "Nikki" Maxwell, the main character of the Dork Diaries book series
 Nicole "Niki" Smith, an alternate personality of the character Victoria Lord Banks on the American soap opera One Life to Live Nicole Travis Drake Cavanaugh, a long running character in the crime/mystery serial The Edge of Night Nicole Walker, a character on the American soap opera Days of Our Lives Nicole Wallace, a character on Law & Order: Criminal Intent played by actress Olivia d'Abo
 Nicole Watterson, a character from the 2011 TV series The Amazing World of Gumball Nicole "Nikki" Newman, a character on the America soap opera The Young and the Restless Nicole Rayleigh Haught, the out lesbian Sheriff of Purgatory in Wynonna Earp''

See also

References

English feminine given names